Mario Eduardo Moreno Burgos (December 31, 1935 – March 2, 2005) was a Chilean footballer who played as a right winger for Chilean teams Colo-Colo and Antofagasta Portuario and represented the Chile national team at the 1962 FIFA World Cup.

Personal life

Honours
Colo-Colo
 Primera Division: 1960, 1963, 1970

References

External links
 Profile at FIFA.com

1935 births
2005 deaths
Footballers from Santiago
Chilean footballers
Association football wingers
Chile international footballers
Colo-Colo footballers
C.D. Antofagasta footballers
Chilean Primera División players
Primera B de Chile players
1962 FIFA World Cup players